Aguada Fénix is a large Preclassic Mayan ruin located in the state of Tabasco, Mexico, near the border with Guatemala. The site was discovered by aerial survey using laser mapping, and announced in 2020. The flattened mound, nearly a mile in length and between 33 and 50 feet tall, is described as the oldest and the largest Mayan ceremonial site known. The monumental structure is constructed of earth and clay, and is believed to have been built from around 1000 BC to 800 BC.

Discovery
The finding of Aguada Fénix was announced in June 2020 by Takeshi Inomata, an archaeologist with the University of Arizona in Tucson, who is part a research team started in 2017 called the Middle Usumacinta Archaeological Project. The site is located near the San Pedro River in northeastern Tabasco. It was mapped from the air and excavation begun, resulting in finds including pottery and jade axes.

Characteristics
The large platform is conjectured by scientists to have been built by communal labor, possibly showing the importance of communal work in the initial development of Maya civilization. The clay and earth rectangular mound is about 1,400 m long and 400 m wide, and in volume reported to be greater than the mass of the Great Pyramid of Giza. Nine massive causeways and several reservoirs are components of the overall structural site, which currently is partially wooded and otherwise used for cattle ranching.

See also
Platform mound

References

Maya Preclassic Period
Former populated places in Mexico